Wayne Lee Madsen (born 2 January 1984) is an English cricketer who plays for Derbyshire County Cricket Club. He has previously played field hockey for the South Africa men's national field hockey team.

Cricket career
Hailing from a strong cricketing family, with uncles Henry Fotheringham, Michael Madsen, Trevor Madsen and cousin Greg Fotheringham all playing first-class cricket in South Africa, Madsen made his debut in 2003 for KwaZulu-Natal cricket team. In August 2009 he signed his contract with Derbyshire, following a strong run of form with two centuries in four games. He captained Derbyshire for four seasons; in the 2012 season, Derbyshire were promoted from County Championship Division Two to Division One. They were relegated the following season, and Madsen was named the Championship's Player of the Season. After gaining UK citizenship in February 2015, Madsen announced that he hoped to represent England in the future. Ahead of the 2016 season, he signed a contract extension until 2019. He also stepped down as Derbyshire's County Championship captain, and was replaced by Billy Godleman. In the 2017 t20 Blast, Madsen scored 526 runs, a record for a Derbyshire player in the competition. Madsen later signed a contract extension with Derbyshire until 2022.

Madsen has also played in the Pakistan Super League. He has signed for Manchester Originals for The Hundred. In April 2022, he was bought by the Manchester Originals for the 2022 season of The Hundred. On 31 May 2022, in the T20 Blast against the Yorkshire Vikings, Madsen played in his 400th match for Derbyshire. On 3 July 2022, also in the T20 Blast, Madsen scored his first century in Twenty20 cricket, with 100 not out against Durham.

Hockey career
Madsen made 39 appearances for the South Africa men's national field hockey team. He represented South Africa at the 2006 Commonwealth Games and 2006 Men's Hockey World Cup. In 2015, he became Director of Hockey at Belper Hockey Club. His brother Lloyd has also played hockey for South Africa.

References

External links
 

1984 births
Cricketers from Durban
KwaZulu-Natal cricketers
Living people
South African cricketers
South African emigrants to the United Kingdom
Derbyshire cricket captains
Peshawar Zalmi cricketers
Multan Sultans cricketers
English cricketers
Naturalised citizens of the United Kingdom
Manchester Originals cricketers
2006 Men's Hockey World Cup players